The 2003–04 Biathlon World Cup was a multi-race tournament over a season of biathlon, organised by the International Biathlon Union. The Biathlon World Championships 2004 were part of the Biathlon World Cup.

The men's overall World Cup was won by Raphaël Poirée, while Liv Grete Skjelbreid Poirée of Norway claimed the women's overall World Cup.

Calendar 
Below is the World Cup calendar for the 2004–05 season.

World Cup Podium

Men

Women

Men's team

Women's team

Standings: Men

Overall 

Final standings after 26 races.

Individual 

Final standings after 3 races.

Sprint 

Final standings after 10 races.

Pursuit 

Final standings after 9 races.

Mass Start 

Final standings after 4 races.

Relay 

Final standings after 4 races.

Nation 

Final standings after 17 races.

Standings: Women

Overall 

Final standings after 26 races.

Individual 

Final standings after 3 races.

Sprint 

Final standings after 10 races.

Pursuit 

Final standings after 9 races.

Mass Start 

Final standings after 4 races.

Relay 

Final standings after 4 races.

Nation 

Final standings after 17 races.

Medal table

Achievements
Victory in this World Cup (all-time number of victories in parentheses)

Men
 , 11 (34) first places
 , 5 (43) first places
 , 3 (3) first places
 , 2 (25) first places
 , 2 (8) first places
 , 1 (8) first place
 , 1 (6) first place
 , 1 (3) first place

Women
 , 7 (20) first places
 , 6 (8) first places
 , 4 (7) first places
 , 3 (24) first places
 , 2 (2) first places
 , 1 (19) first place
 , 1 (5) first place
 , 1 (2) first place
 , 1 (1) first place

Retirements
The following notable biathletes retired after the 2003–04 season:

References

External links

World Cup
World Cup
Biathlon World Cup

de:Biathlon-Weltcup 2004/2005
fr:Coupe du monde de biathlon 2004-2005
it:Coppa del Mondo di biathlon 2005
no:Verdenscupen i skiskyting 2004/05
pl:Puchar Świata w biathlonie 2004/2005
ru:Кубок мира по биатлону 2004/2005
sv:Världscupen i skidskytte 2004/2005